Qais Omar Alshabebi (born 31 October 1991) is an Emirati professional basketball player. He currently plays for Shabab Al Ahli of the UAE National Basketball League. He also played for Petrochimi Bandar Pahlavi BC at Iranian Basketball Super League and also become the best Rebound of 2016 FIBA Asia Champions Cup at this Irania club.

He represented the UAE's national basketball team at the 2017 Arab Nations Cup in Egypt. There, he was one of the tournament’s dominant scorers. Overall, he averaged 18 points per game, and finished as the second best scorer, only behind Morocco’s  Soufiane Kourdou who achieved 18.6.

References

External links
 FIBA Asia Champions Cup 2017 Profile
 Asia-basket.com Profile
 Real GM Profile

1991 births
Living people
Emirati men's basketball players
Sportspeople from Dubai
Centers (basketball)
Shabab Al Ahli Basket players